Epiblema foenella, the white-foot bell, is a moth of the family Tortricidae.

Description
The wingspan is 17–26 mm. This quite-common moth has dark brown forewings with a striking falcate medio-dorsal white marking and a gray-colored area at the ends of the wings. The shape of the white marking is quite variable.

This species has one generation and the mature caterpillars overwinter. The larvae feed on the roots and lower stem of mugwort or common wormwood (Artemisia vulgaris), of southernwood (Artemisia abrotanum) and of golden marguerite (Anthemis tinctoria). The moth flies from May to August depending on the location. They usually fly from late afternoon into the evening.

Distribution
This species can be found in most of Europe, southern Russia, the Caucasus, Siberia, Kazakhstan, Kyrgyzstan, Mongolia, the Russian Far East, China (Tianjin, Hebei, Inner Mongolia, Jilin, Heilongjiang, Jiangsu, Zhejiang, Anhui, Fujian, Jiangxi, Shandong, Henan, Hubei, Hunan, Guangxi, Sichuan, Guizhou, Yunnan, Shaanxi, Gansu, Qinghai, Ningxia, Xinjiang), Korea, Japan, India, Taiwan and Vietnam.

Habitat
The white-foot bell prefers rough uncultivated ground, grassland, scrub, river banks and coastal cliffs.

Synonyms

Ephippiphora faeneana  Guenee, 1845
Epiblema accentana  Caradja, 1916 
Epiblema acclivilla  Uffeln, 1912 
Epiblema albrechtella  Meyer, 1911
Epiblema circumflexa  Caradja, 1916 
Epiblema confluens  Wörz, 1953 
Epiblema divisa   Wörz, 1953 
Epiblema effusana  Uffeln, 1912 
Epiblema focnella  Escherich, 1931
Epiblema foenella ab. accentana  Caradja, 1916
Epiblema foenella ab. albrechtella  Meyer, 1911
Epiblema foenella ab. circumflexana  Caradja, 1916
Epiblema foenella ab. separana  Krulikowsky, 1908
Epiblema foenella f. acclivella  Uffeln, 1912
Epiblema foenella f. confluens  Wrz, 1953
Epiblema foenella f. divisa  Wrz, 1953
Epiblema foenella f. effusana  Uffeln, 1912
Epiblema foenella f. fracta  Popescu-Gorj, 1965
Epiblema foenella f. fuscata  Wrz, 1953
Epiblema foenella f. interrupta  Wurz, 1953
Epiblema foenella f. trapezoidalis  Popescu-Gorj, 1965
Epiblema foenella f. unicolor  Uffeln, 1912
Epiblema fracta  Popescu-Gorj, 1965 
Epiblema fuscata  Wörz, 1953 
Epiblema interrupta  Wörz, 1953 
Epiblema separana  Krulikovski, 1905 
Epiblema trapezoidalis  Popescu-Gorj, 1965 
Epiblema unicolor  Uffeln, 1912 
Epiblema unicolorana  Klemensiewicz, 1906 
Grapholita clavigerana  Walker, 1863
Grapholitha foenella ab. unicolorana  Klemensiewicz, 1900
Paedisca foeneana  Treitschke, 1830
Phalaena (Tinea) foenella  Linnaeus, 1758
Phalaena (Tortrix) tibialana  Hubner, 1793
Phalaena fonella  Zeller, 1853
Phalaena hochenwartiana  Scopoli, 1772 
Phalaena interrogationana  Donovan, [1793]
Pyralis pflugiana  Fabricius, 1787
Sciaphila sinicana  Walker, 1863 
Tortrix foenana  Haworth, [1811]
Tortrix scopoliana  [Denis & Schiffermuller], 1775
Tortrix tibialana Hübner , 1796

References

Eucosmini
Moths described in 1758
Taxa named by Carl Linnaeus
Moths of Europe
Moths of Asia